Café Tacuba is the self-titled debut album by Café Tacuba, released in 1992. Rubén Albarrán, the band's lead singer, was credited as "Juan, Él que hace como que Canta" ("Juán, the one who pretends to sing") in the liner notes.

Track listing

Many of the songs on this album, notably "La Chica Banda" and "Labios Jaguar" makes reference of Native Americans and mestizos in Mexico.

Band members
 Juan (Rubén Albarrán): vocals, guitar
 Emmanuel Del Real: keyboards, acoustic guitar, piano, programming, vocals, melodion
 Joselo Rangel: electric guitar, acoustic guitar, vocals
 Quique Rangel: bass guitar, electric upright bass, vocals

References

Café Tacuba albums
1992 debut albums
Albums produced by Gustavo Santaolalla